The Port is a 2019 Russian drama film directed and written by Aleksandra Strelyanaya.

Plot 
The film tells about the daughter of boxing trainer, Cyrus, who had an accident. Her father created a simulator for her, sincerely believing that she would be able to return to her former life. In the meantime, a certain Andrei comes to the hall, and Kira immediately falls in love, which returns her will to life and hope that everything will work out.

Cast
 Aleksei Guskov		
 Yuri Borisov
 Mariya Borovicheva	
 Vladimir Daraganov	
 Lev Semashkov
 Mikhail Evlanov
 Irina Vilkova

References

External links 
 

2019 films
Russian drama films
2010s Russian-language films